The 2009–10 season was the 107th season of competitive football in Spain.

Transfers Windows

Promotion and relegation (pre-season)
Teams promoted to 2009–10 La Liga
 Xerez CD
 Real Zaragoza
 CD Tenerife

Teams relegated from 2008–09 La Liga
 Real Betis
 CD Numancia
 Recreativo Huelva

Teams promoted to 2009–10 Segunda División
 Cádiz CF
 FC Cartagena
 Villarreal B
 Real Unión

Teams relegated from 2008–09 Segunda División
 CD Alavés
 Alicante CF
 SD Eibar
 Sevilla Atlético

Teams promoted to 2009–10 Segunda División B
 Gimnástica de Torrelavega
 Unión Estepona CF
 Villajoyosa CF
 CD Varea
 RCD Espanyol B
 Real Oviedo
 CD Toledo
 CF Palencia
 SD Compostela
 CD Izarra
 CD San Roque de Lepe
 RSD Alcalá
 AD Cerro Reyes
 CF Sporting Mahonés
 CP Cacereño
 Caravaca CF
 RCD Mallorca B
 CD Mirandés

Teams relegated from 2008–09 Segunda División B
 SD Ciudad de Santiago
 Deportivo B
 Real Sociedad B
 Real Valladolid B
 Marino de Luanco
 Lorca Deportiva CF
 Mérida UD
 UD Fuerteventura
 Las Palmas Atlético
 CDA Navalcarnero
 Pájara Playas
 CD Alfaro
 Villa Santa Brígida
 UD Alzira
 UD Ibiza-Eivissa
 Santa Eulàlia
 CD Atlético Baleares
 Antequera CF
 Real Balompédica Linense
 Racing Club Portuense

National team
The home team is on the left column; the away team is on the right column.

World Cup qualifiers
Spain was in Group 5 of the 2010 FIFA World Cup qualification process.

Friendly matches

Honours

Trophy and League Champions

League tables

La Liga

Segunda División

Segunda División B

Tercera División